David John Shearlock is an Anglican priest and author  in the last third of the 20th century. He was born on 1 July 1932 and educated at the University of Birmingham. He was ordained in 1957 and began his career with curacies at St Nicholas, Guisborough and Christchurch Priory. He then held incumbencies at St Mary Kingsclere and Romsey Abbey. Finally he was Dean of Truro from 1982 until his resignation in 1997. He continues his Ministry in retirement based in Dorset.

Notes

1932 births
Alumni of the University of Birmingham
Fellows of the Royal Geographical Society
Deans of Truro
Living people